Coffs Harbour railway station is located on the North Coast line in New South Wales, Australia. It serves the city of Coffs Harbour, opening on 30 August 1915.

The present station building opened in October 1971. In 1996, the freight yard and crossing loop opposite the station closed.

On 29 and 30 August 2015, a commemorative event was held to celebrate the stations 100th birthday with visiting steam locomotive 5917 from Lachlan Valley Railway. A plaque honouring the event was unveiled by the then current Member for Coffs Harbour, Andrew Fraser.

Platforms & services
Coffs Harbour has one platform. A goods yard previously existed opposite the station, but has since been removed. Each day northbound XPT services operate to Grafton, Casino and Brisbane, with three southbound services operating to Sydney.

Transport links
New England Coaches service to Tamworth operates from the station.

References

External links

Easy Access railway stations in New South Wales
Railway stations in Australia opened in 1915
Regional railway stations in New South Wales
Coffs Harbour
North Coast railway line, New South Wales